Par Chinak (also Romanized as Par Chīnak) is a village in Kuhsaran Rural District, in the Central District of Qaem Shahr County, Mazandaran Province, Iran. At the 2006 census, its population was 103, in 29 families.

References 

Populated places in Qaem Shahr County